Satyajitsinh Duleepsinh Gaekwad  is an Indian Politician and was a Member of Parliament of the 11th Lok Sabha of India, from 1996 to 1998. Gaekwad represented the Vadodara constituency of Gujarat and is a member of the Indian National Congress political party.

References 

India MPs 1996–1997
1962 births
Lok Sabha members from Gujarat
People from Vadodara
People from Vadodara district
Living people
Indian National Congress politicians from Gujarat